Marion station was a train station in Marion, Indiana.

History
The station was added as a stop on Amtrak's Mountaineer and James Whitcomb Riley in 1975. Passenger service to Marion ended in 1986 when the Cardinal (renamed from the James Whitcomb Riley in 1977) was rerouted onto the former Baltimore and Ohio Railroad in Ohio and Indiana, and the former Monon Railroad (alongside the Hoosier State train) north-west of Indianapolis.

The station building was subsequently torn down and the tracks were removed to allow for construction of a rail trail.

References

External links
Marion Amtrak Station (USA Rail Guide — Train Web)

Marion, Indiana
Railway stations in the United States opened in 1975
Railway stations closed in 1986
Former Amtrak stations in Indiana
Demolished railway stations in the United States
Stations along Chesapeake and Ohio Railway lines
Transportation buildings and structures in Grant County, Indiana